was a Japanese sailor. He competed in the Star event at the 1936 Summer Olympics.

References

External links
 

1909 births
Year of death missing
Japanese male sailors (sport)
Olympic sailors of Japan
Sailors at the 1936 Summer Olympics – Star
Place of birth missing